The James New York – NoMad, formerly the Seville Hotel and Carlton Hotel, is a historic hotel building at 22 East 29th Street and 88 Madison Avenue in the NoMad neighborhood of Manhattan, New York City. It was designed by Harry Allan Jacobs and built in 1901–04 in the Beaux-Arts style, with an annex built in 1906-07 which was designed by Charles T. Mott.

Its name was changed to the Carlton Hotel in 1987. By 2018 it had become the James NoMad Hotel, one of two James New York hotels. It was added to the National Register of Historic Places in 2005, and it became a New York City designated landmark in 2018, along with the Emmet Building across the street.

See also
 National Register of Historic Places listings in Manhattan from 14th to 59th Streets
 List of New York City Designated Landmarks in Manhattan from 14th to 59th Streets

References

External links
 
 James New York – NoMad website

Beaux-Arts architecture in New York City
Hotel buildings completed in 1904
Hotel buildings on the National Register of Historic Places in Manhattan
Madison Avenue
1904 establishments in New York City